Baozhou or Bao Prefecture, known as Baosai Prefecture between 960 and 981, was a zhou (prefecture) in imperial China centering on modern Baoding, Hebei, China.

It was created in 960 by the Song dynasty and lasted until 1241, when the Mongol Empire (who conquered the Jin dynasty in 1234) abolished it.

References

 

Prefectures of the Song dynasty
Prefectures of the Jin dynasty (1115–1234)
Former prefectures in Hebei